In many cultures, there is a tradition of removing one's shoes in the home and places such as churches, temples and schools.

Backgrounds 
In religions originating in the Indian subcontinent and in the Middle East, it is customary to remove one's shoes when entering a house of worship. In the Bible, God commanded Moses to remove his sandals before approaching Him on Mount Sinai (cf. ). The cultural context of this narrative regards shoes as bringing in dust into the home and removing one's shoes "would be a way of recognizing one's personal uncleanness in the presence of holiness." Hinduism and Islam also regard feet as being unclean; it is considered sacrilegious to touch books with one's feet and an insult to point one's feet at someone. As such, in many mandirs and mosques, as well as in churches and synagogues of the Indian subcontinent and Middle East, it is customary for worshippers to remove their shoes before entering a house of worship, where they believe they are entering into the presence of the divine.

In the world

Asia 

Many Asian countries typically follow the tradition of removing shoes before entering a house.

In Pakistan, Afghanistan and other countries where having carpeted rugs are common, it is considered necessary to take one's shoes off in order to walk on carpeted rugs inside the home.

Western Asia 
In Iran, removing one's shoes before entering a home is a widespread tradition, with the cleanliness of a home very important for families. It is also common to remove shoes in kindergarten schools and, although rarely, in some small private businesses.

In the Arab world, no shoes are allowed indoors, as the shoes' soles are seen as dirty and unsanitary. Arab Muslims are required to remove their shoes when entering a mosque, as are all adherents of Islam.

While it is not mandatory in Judaism, many Israeli Jews remove their shoes at home. Israel is also home to many Muslims, who harbour much stricter shoe-wearing rules than their Jewish counterparts.

Eastern Asia 

In addition, there are separate  into which one changes before entering the washroom from the rest of the house. The outdoors are considered to be an extremely unclean space by the Japanese people, alongside the aforementioned toilet area. Only the indoors is considered a clean space, and it is typically kept very tidy by the homeowner. One must change into appropriate footwear before entering the corresponding spaces. On tatami, it is often considered to be inappropriate to wear even .

It is habitual to remove outdoor footwear and put on a pair of slippers after entering the Chinese household, although some people in certain parts of China do not take off their shoes at home. In social reunions or parties at houses, guests are not always demanded to take their shoes off, especially in big celebrations such as the Chinese New Year, when the number of guests in a house is frequently superior to the number of slippers available for guests.

In Korea, it is customary to take one's shoes off at the entryway, known as hyun-gwan (현관), before entering a house. Some households may use indoor slippers, but it is far more common to walk around barefoot or in socks. In the bathroom, Koreans typically wear rubber slippers to prevent slipping. Entering a house with shoes on is considered disrespectful, as it is synonymous with bringing in outside dirt and grime to one's residence. Modern Korean apartments often have built-in shoe cabinets at the hyun-gwan, which doubles down as a storage area for other objects.

Southeast Asia 
In Malaysia, it is common practice (amongst all of the various ethnic communities) to remove their shoes before entering any house or apartment. More modern households will use and provide indoor slippers. Some temples like Batu Caves and religious places such as mosques and suraus require the removal of shoes before entering. Modern schools require students to remove their shoes before entering air-conditioned spaces including designated classrooms, laboratories, libraries and carpeted administrative spaces. Students still wear shoes at more open spaces such as sports courts, halls, passively ventilated classrooms, passively ventilated laboratories or in the corridors; these areas are more exposed to the elements as Malaysian schools are mostly passively ventilated, allowing natural airflow due to the warm weather. Some smaller private offices and mixed shopfront-offices exercise the removal of shoes, especially on (but not limited to) carpeted floors.

In Thailand, all homes require the removal of shoes and placement of them in front of the main door. One also needs to remove their shoes to enter some buildings in Thai temples, especially in Ubosot. Kindergarten schools and some buildings in old elementary or high schools also require students to take off their shoes as well. However, in some houses or schools, slippers are allowed, but those are not allowed outside the buildings, as well in some restrooms there are provided sandals for changing before entering restrooms to keep it clean.

In Vietnam, it is customary to remove shoes before entering any house or flat. It is also common to remove shoes in kindergarten schools and in some small private businesses.

Myanmar (Burma) 

In Myanmar, footwear is customarily removed before entering a home and Buddhist places of worship. Many workplaces in Myanmar also have shoe-free areas, or restrict footwear altogether, with shoes typically left at the corridor or at the entrance of an office. 

These customs are strictly enforced in Buddhist places of worship, including Burmese pagodas and in Buddhist monasteries called kyaung. The Burmese remove their footwear at such sites as a sign of religious respect. 

Strict enforcement of this custom, however, is partly a legacy of British rule in Burma, during which Europeans refused and were exempted from removing their footwear when entering Buddhist places of worship. In pre-colonial Burma, non-royals removed their footwear before entering palace grounds, as a token of respect for the reigning monarch. In the final years of the Konbaung dynasty, diplomatic relations between the British and Burmese soured when the British Resident, a colonial representative, refused to remove his shoes upon entering the Mandalay Palace platform, a decision that prevented him from meeting King Thibaw Min. Consequently, the British withdrew the Resident and his delegation in October 1879, with his exit portending the Third Anglo-Burmese War, after which the remaining half of the Burmese kingdom (Upper Burma) was fully annexed into British India.

This "shoe question" became a rallying cry for Burmese nationalists, comparable to the cow protection movement in neighboring British India. In 1916, the nationalist Young Men's Buddhist Association (YMBA) began campaigning against foreigners wearing shoes in pagoda grounds, with Buddhist monks at the forefront of the campaign. The Ledi Sayadaw, a prominent Buddhist monk, penned On the Impropriety of Wearing Shoes on Pagoda Platforms, which drew in widespread support for the YMBA's activism. 

In 1919, after a two-year battle, Cambridge-educated barrister, Thein Maung, a YMBA member, successfully persuaded the colonial government to issue an order prohibiting footwear on the grounds of religious sites. Thein Maung's undertaking was in direct response to the actions of Archibald Cochrane, future Governor of Burma, who had kept his shoes on while touring Shwemawdaw Pagoda in Pegu (now Bago) in 1917, much to the indignation of locals.

In recent years, foreigners have been successfully prosecuted and punished for refusing to remove their footwear at Burmese religious sites. In August 2017, a Russian tourist was arrested and sentenced to one month and then a further six months of jail time and hard labor for repeatedly refusing to remove her shoes upon entering pagoda grounds throughout Bagan, as she had violated local customs, per Section 13(1) of the Immigration Act. Burmese authorities subsequently announced a crackdown tourists wearing shoes inside Bagan's pagodas.

India 
It is considered a matter of hygiene to remove shoes before entering one's home. When people walk outside wearing shoes, they tend to bring dirt, grime, bacteria and infectious diseases into the house.  In India, it is also customary for shoes to be taken off before entering others' homes. It is often considered by hosts, as rude when guests keep their shoes on whilst inside the house. It is considered sacrilegious to touch books with one's feet and an insult to point one's feet at someone.

Australasia

New Zealand
Removing shoes before entering a house is common-place in New Zealand, in all areas and may stem from the Māori tradition of removing shoes before entering the Marae.

Europe

Western Europe 
 In the United Kingdom, there are people in both camps.   That said, it is uncommon for people to walk around barefoot with people preferring to keep their socks on.

In France, it is less common to take one's shoes off systematically when entering one's home or to request that guests do.

In the Netherlands it is a little uncommon to take off your shoes at home. Visitors are not usually expected to take off their shoes when entering a home. However, in some cases a host may ask people entering the home to take off their shoes. Like in the UK, it is uncommon to walk around barefoot.

In Ireland, it is very uncommon to take one's shoes off when entering a house, especially for visitors.

Southern Europe 
In Italy, shoes are customarily removed at the front door upon arrival at home. It is uncommon for Italians to go barefoot in the home, however, due to concerns over the spread of dust-borne pathogen. Because of this, the use of slippers (commonly referred to as pantofole or ciabatta) in the Italian home has become universal; wool types are worn during the winter and open-toed during the summer. However, this does not apply when entering someone else's home, or when welcoming guests at your own home, as, in both cases, wearing shoes is usual and as a sign of respect. Furthermore, areas outside the home are considered dirty and thus the use of shoes which fully cover the foot are mandated, harrowing back to the stereotype of the overly-tidy Italian mother and her mammoni children.

There is no specific standard on footwear in the Spanish or Portuguese home. It is commonplace in both countries to enter the home with shoes on. Nevertheless, some people in Spain choose to wear slippers. In Portugal, it is equally common for people to go barefoot in the home due to the warm weather, cleaner surfaces and proximity to the ocean. Generally speaking, the Portuguese and Spaniards usually set their own rules regarding footwear in their own homes, while visitors expect to be given instruction.

In Greece, it is uncommon to go barefoot in the home.  When at home it's a personal choice to either wear shoes or slippers, however, the use of slippers (commonly referred to as "pantofles") in one's own home is commonplace. It is not customary to remove one's shoes when visiting another household unless one is asked to do so, and shoes are not removed on any social occasion. Shoes are kept on in churches, as well as all other public indoor spaces.

In Turkey, most people remove their shoes before entering any house. Not to remove shoes is a major faux pas for guests, instead slippers are offered. Students or employees never remove their shoes before entering their buildings (schools, workplaces, etc.). The only practice of removing shoes outside the home is before entering "inside" the mosque; however, people never remove shoes when in a mosque's courtyard or garden.

Eastern Europe 
In all the Slavic countries (Russia, Ukraine, Poland, etc.), most of which are in Eastern Europe, people will take off their shoes at home and will expect visitors to do so, unless it is a formal meeting or a social event. When in doubt, people will usually ask if they can keep their shoes on. When at home, some people will walk barefoot while others will wear slippers (this often depends on the type of floor covering, e.g. carpets vs wooden floor). It is common for schoolchildren to have a special pair of shoes for wearing at school, especially in winter. Furthermore, many households provide spare indoor slippers for visitors. Some people will have a special pair of shoes for wearing at work, especially in winter. In restaurants, shops, theatres, and museums shoes are not taken off. Shoes are not taken off in churches.

In the southeast of Europe (former Yugoslavia, Albania, Bulgaria, etc.), people traditionally remove their shoes and either walk barefoot or wear indoor slippers at home, especially in winter. Visitors that venture beyond the entry hallway are expected to remove their shoes. Because of this, it is considered courteous for hosts to provide slippers for their guests. Some workplaces may require their employees reserve a pair of shoes for indoor use. Shoes are kept on in churches, as well as most other public indoor spaces, but they are always removed in mosques.

Central Europe 
In Central Europe, the customs there regarding the commonality of shoe-wearing in the home and beyond remains mostly identical to that of the Slavs. This holds especially true for the nations of Hungary, Romania, and Moldova. Further, Poland, a Slavic country, is typically included in the definition for Central Europe in opposition to Eastern Europe.

In Slovenia like in former Yugoslavia, people traditionally remove their shoes and wear indoor slippers at home. For visitors slippers are provided if entering the house.

In Germany and Austria shoes are mostly also traditionally removed, but to a less extent, being also not uncommon to let them in. This is the case especially for short visits, even if entering interior rooms.

Northern Europe 
In Northern Europe, Scandinavia it is considered unhygienic and rude by most to keep one's shoes on when entering a house, in particular boots or outdoor walking shoes. There may be exceptions, especially when it is a short visit where it is not necessary to enter the interior rooms of the house or flat. For the most part though, shoes are taken off - in part due to the harsh winter weather.

North America

United States 
Taking shoes off indoors is not a tradition within the continental United States, but is considered expected in Hawaii, Alaska, Guam, and the Northern Mariana Islands. According to a YouGov poll in 2018, whilst many Americans take off their shoes whilst indoors at home, they may or may not request their guests to take off their shoes. It is also prevalent in the Northeast due to poor weather in the winter, as well as in the Pacific Northwest, with standards differing from household to household. In New England, many elementary schools require students to bring an indoor pair of shoes as well as winter boots. This is especially the case during rainy weather, when one's shoes could easily get very muddy, wet, or dirty. However, removing of shoes is common among certain immigrant communities. In most Asian, European and Middle Eastern homes, shoes are never worn inside as it can be a sign of disrespect from the guests to the owners of the home.

Canada 
In Canada, households do not wear shoes in the home. In general it is expected that a guest would remove their shoes on entering a home unless the host states otherwise. 

In addition to residential homes, the removal of shoes also occurs in other settings, particularly during the winter; as footwear worn outside may be wet from snow and soiled by the associated salt/sand that is used to clear roads of snow cover. As a result, many schools in Canada require students to bring with them or leave behind a pair of "indoor shoes" at the school for indoor wear during the winter months. Similarly in office settings, employees will usually wear indoor shoes in the winter. However outdoor shoes are worn in office settings in the summer. Some specialized medical facilities require patients to remove shoes in order to maintain cleanliness, or to at least wear disposable paper bootees over those shoes. The latter with anti-static protections are common in cleanrooms in medical and technological facilities worldwide.

See also
Hygiene in Christianity
List of shoe-throwing incidents
Shoe tossing

References 

Lo scarpisfero
Living in Canada? Take your shoes off.
Jews and Shoes
Arab culture: the insult of the shoe

Traditions
Shoes
Indian culture
Pakistani culture
Japanese culture
Korean culture
Burmese culture